A junior sergeant is a military rank used in the armed forces of many countries. It is usually placed below sergeant.

Russia 

Junior sergeant is the designation to the lowest rank in the non-commissioned officer's career group in the Army, Airborne troops, and Air Force of the Russian Federation. The rank is equivalent to Starshina 2nd class in Navy.

The rank was introduced in the Red Army in 1940.

Insignia of junior sergeants

See also 
 Sergeant

References

Military ranks
Military ranks of Estonia
Mladshiy serzhant